Claud Hamilton, 4th Earl of Abercorn PC (Ire) (1659–1691) was a Scottish and Irish peer who fought for the Jacobites in the Williamite War. He went with King James to Derry in 1689 and tried to negotiate the surrender of the town with Adam Murray. He raised a regiment of horse that he led in the defeats of Newtownbutler in 1689 and Aughrim in 1691. He was killed when the ship that should have brought him to France was intercepted by a Dutch privateer.

Birth and origins 
Claud was born in 1659, probably at Kenure House in Rush near Dublin, as the eldest son of George Hamilton, and Elizabeth Fagan. His father was the 4th Baron Hamilton of Strabane and an important landowner around Strabane, County Tyrone, Ulster, Ireland. The Strabanes were at that time a cadet branch of the Abercorns. Claud's mother was a rich heiress, the only child of Christopher Fagan of Feltrim, County Dublin.

He heads the list of siblings below as the eldest:
Claud (1659–1691)
Anne (died 1680), married John Browne
Charles (died 1701), succeeded him as the 5th Earl of Abercorn
Mary, married Garrett Dillon, Recorder of Dublin

His parents were both Catholic. The family's usual residence was Kenure House in Rush near Dublin, where he and his siblings were probably born and where his father died.

Father's succession 
In 1668, at the age of nine, he succeeded his father as the 5th Baron Hamilton of Strabane. He was usually called Lord Strabane rather than Lord Hamilton as the latter title was also that of the earls of Hamilton in Scotland.

Abercorn succession 
Around 1680 his father's cousin (his second cousin once removed) George Hamilton, 3rd Earl of Abercorn, died in faraway Padua, Italy. With him failed the senior line of the Abercorns. The succession passed to the Strabane branch, the descendants of Claud Hamilton, 2nd Baron Hamilton of Strabane, the second son of the 1st Earl of Abercorn, of which Claud was the living representative. He, therefore, succeeded his cousin as the 4th Earl of Abercorn. This elevated him from baron to earl but did not make him much richer as the 2nd Earl had lost most of the Scottish Abercorn lands.

With the Jacobites in Ireland 
Lord Abercorn, as he was now, followed James II to France at the Glorious Revolution, and went with James to Ireland in 1689. When James arrived in Dublin and established his administration, Abercorn was appointed a member of the Jacobite Privy Council of Ireland and a Lord of the Bedchamber.

Abercorn went with the King up to Derry and was present on 18 April 1689 when James II asked the city to surrender. On 20 April 1689 the king sent him to the walls with a last proposal, which was however rejected by Adam Murray, who represented the city. Upon this, the army began the Siege of Derry.

He raised a regiment of horse in Ireland for James, and led it in Lord Mountcashel's expedition against Enniskillen in July 1689. He was wounded in Mountcashel's defeat at Newtownbutler on 31 July. Abercorn was outlawed and attainted in Ireland by the Williamites on 11 May 1691, forfeiting his Irish peerage.

On 12 July 1691 he fought at the Battle of Aughrim under Saint Ruth against the Williamites under Ginkel. His regiment was part of the cavalry on the right wing of the Jacobites, which was commanded by de Tessé. The cavalry comprised the regiments Tyrconnel and Abercorn and probably also the regiment Prendergast. It may have been commanded by Sarsfield, but others say Sarsfield commanded a cavalry reserve behind the centre.

At that battle, the Williamites turned the left wing and then rolled up the Jacobite position from that side. The cavalry on the right was showered with fleeing foot soldiers from the left wing and the centre, and came late into action or fled without a fight.

Death and succession 
Richard Talbot, 1st Earl of Tyrconnel, sent him to France to carry news of the defeat to James, and ask for help. He boarded a ship for France at Limerick, but the ship was intercepted by a Dutch privateer and Abercorn was killed in the fight that ensued.

He was 32 years old and had never married. He was succeeded by his younger brother Charles, who had become a Protestant and had sided with William at the Glorious Revolution. His brother became the 5th Earl of Abercorn immediately as this title was in the peerage of Scotland and not affected by the Irish attainder. In 1692 the 5th Earl obtained the reversal of the attainder and thus became the 6th Baron Hamilton of Strabane and recovered the Irish estates.

Notes and references

Notes

Citations

Sources

Books 

  – ABE to CUR (for Abercorn)
 
 
  – Ab-Adam to Basing
 
  – (for timeline)
 
  – Short biographies in the biographical notes
 
 
  – Viscounts (for Strabane)
 
 
  – Abercorn to Balmerino (for Abercorn)

London Gazette 
 

1659 births
1691 deaths
17th-century Irish people
04
Claud
Irish Jacobites
Jacobite military personnel of the Williamite War in Ireland
Members of the Irish House of Lords
People from County Tyrone